Dolcè is a comune (municipality) in the Province of Verona in the Italian region Veneto, located about  west of Venice and about  northwest of Verona, in the Adige Valley.

Main sights
Parish church of Volargne (13th century), with frescoes
Palazzo Guerrieri-Rizzardi (14th century)
Villa Del Bene (16th century)
Castelleto (13th century), a fortification at 400 m of altitude

Twin towns
 Undenheim, Germany, since 1996

References

External links
 Official website
 Dolcè in Encyclopedia Treccani

Cities and towns in Veneto